Fenerbahçe University or FBU for short, is a private university in Istanbul established by the relevant foundation of the Fenerbahçe Sports Club.

At Fenerbahçe Faruk Ilgaz Facilities in April 2016; the workshop on its establishment, management and operation started. In the first year of accepting students, Medicana Group invested ₺100M. Security of the campus network and Internet of Things technologies were carried out with Aruba, a Hewlett Packard Enterprise company. In 2020, it started to contribute to the National Combat Aircraft Project, which is carried out in cooperation with TÜBİTAK and TUSAŞ. Faculty of Communication students; In December 2019, started the social responsibility project "Neither Child Neither Adolescent" and place in the Young Spokesperson of the Environment Competition organized by the International Environment Foundation in February 2020 won the first.

Academic units

Faculty of Economics and Administrative Sciences 
English Language and Literature
Economy
Political Science and International Relations
International Finance and Banking

Faculty of Communication 
Public Relations and Publicity
Radio, Television and Cinema
New Media and Communication

Faculty of Engineering and Architecture 
Computer Engineering
Industrial Engineering
Interior Architecture and Environmental Design

Faculty of Health Sciences 
Nutrition and Dietetics
Physical Therapy and Rehabilitation
Nursing
Midwifery
Occupational Therapy

Faculty of Sport Sciences 
Coaching Training
Physical Education and Sports Teaching
Sports Management

Vocational School of Health Services 
Mouth and Dental Health
Anesthesia
Operating Room Services
Dental Prosthesis Technology
Dialysis
Physiotherapy
First and Emergency Aid
Radiotherapy
Medical Imaging Techniques
Medical Laboratory Techniques

Department of Foreign Languages

Institute of Postgraduate Education

Research Centers 
African Studies Practice and Research Center
European Studies Practice and Research Center
Innovation, Technology Practice and Research Center
Cyberspace Studies Practice and Research Center
Regularly Education Practice and Research Center
Turkish Teaching Practice and Research Center
Distance Education Practice and Research Center

Student communities 

Student Council
AFAD Volunteer Club
AİESEC Volunteer Club
Alternative Energy Systems Club
R&D, Innovation and Entrepreneurship Club
Science and Fantasy Fiction Club
Ice Sports Club
Dance club
Outdoor Sports Club
Language Workshop and Speaking Club
Industry Club
Floorball Club
Aviation and Space National Technology Club

IEEE Club
Creative Brain Club
Cricket Club
Rowing and Sailing Club
Music Club
Ombudsman Club
Plastic Arts Club
Robotics Automation Club
Healthy Nutrition Club
Cyber Security Club
Production Research Club
Software and Informatics Club
LGBT+ club

See also 
Fenerbahçe High School
Fenerbahce College

References

External links 

Fenerbahçe
Universities and colleges in Istanbul
Proposed buildings and structures in Turkey
Educational institutions established in 2016
2016 establishments in Turkey